Joel Michael Bitonio (born October 11, 1991) is an American football guard for the Cleveland Browns of the National Football League (NFL). He was drafted by the Browns in the second round of the 2014 NFL Draft. He played college football at Nevada. During his NFL career Bitonio has been named to five Pro Bowls, two first-team and three second-team All-Pro teams.

Early years
Bitonio attended Long Beach Wilson High School in Long Beach, California, where he was a three-sport star. He was named to the Long Beach Press Telegram's Dream Team for football and basketball as a senior. In football, he was a two-time All-league selection and was the Moore League Lineman of the Year. He was a first-team All-conference selection and was named second-team All-state by MaxPreps.com. Bitonio also lettered in track & field as a senior. He led the league in the shot put, recording a top-throw of 15.39 meters at the 2009 CIF Southern Section Division 1 Prelims.

College career
Bitonio attended the University of Nevada from 2009 to 2013. He started 39 consecutive games from his redshirt sophomore to senior seasons. As a senior, he was an All-Mountain West Conference selection.

Professional career

2014 season 
Bitonio was considered one of the top offensive tackle prospects for the 2014 NFL Draft. He was drafted by the Cleveland Browns in the second round (35th overall) of the 2014 NFL Draft.

2015 season 
On December 7, 2015, Bitonio was placed on injured reserve.

2016 season 

On October 14, 2016, Bitonio was again placed on injured reserve after sustaining a foot injury in Week 5.

2017 season 
On March 9, 2017, Bitonio signed a five-year contract extension with the Browns through the 2022 season. He was named to his first Pro Bowl and was named second-team All-Pro after starting all 16 games at left guard.

2020 season 
Bitonio was named to the 2020 NFL All-Pro Team, along with three of his teammates: defensive end Myles Garrett, tackle Jack Conklin, and fellow guard Wyatt Teller. Bitonio was placed on the reserve/COVID-19 list by the team on January 5, 2021, and activated on January 15.

2021 season
On November 10, 2021, Bitonio signed a three-year, $48 million contract extension through the 2025 season.

Personal life
His father, Mike Bitonio, was a mixed martial arts fighter. He died at the age of 45 in 2010.

References

External links
Nevada Wolf pack bio

1991 births
Living people
American football offensive tackles
American football offensive guards
Cleveland Browns players
Nevada Wolf Pack football players
People from San Pedro, Los Angeles
Players of American football from Long Beach, California
American Conference Pro Bowl players